Kundmannia sicula is a species of perennial herb in the family Apiaceae. They have a self-supporting growth form and have broad leaves.

Sources

References 

sicula
Flora of Malta